Phaos interfixa is a moth in the family Erebidae. It was described by Francis Walker in 1855. It is found in Tasmania, Australia.

References

Moths described in 1855
Spilosomina